La indomable may refer to:
 La indomable (Mexican TV series), 1987
 La indomable (Venezuelan TV series), 1974